Sylvain Edward Cappell (born 1946), is a Belgian American mathematician and former student of William Browder at Princeton University, is a topologist who has spent most of his career at the Courant Institute of Mathematical Sciences at NYU, where he is now the Silver Professor of Mathematics.

He was born in Brussels, Belgium and immigrated with his parents to New York City in 1950 and grew up largely in this city. In 1963, as a senior at the Bronx High School of Science, he won first place in the Westinghouse Science Talent Search for his work on "The Theory of Semi-cyclical Groups with Special Reference to Non-Aristotelian Logic." He then graduated from Columbia University in 1966, winning the Van Amringe Mathematical Prize. He is best known for his "codimension one splitting theorem", which is a standard tool in high-dimensional geometric topology, and a number of important results proven with his collaborator Julius Shaneson (now at the University of Pennsylvania).  Their work includes many results in knot theory (and broad generalizations of that subject) and aspects of low-dimensional topology.  They gave the first nontrivial examples of topological conjugacy of linear transformations, which led to a flowering of research on the topological study of spaces with singularities.

More recently, they combined their understanding of singularities, first to lattice point counting in polytopes, then to Euler-Maclaurin type summation formulae, and most recently to counting lattice points in the circle.  This last problem is a classical one, initiated by Gauss, and the paper is still being vetted by experts.

In 2012 he became a fellow of the American Mathematical Society. Cappell was elected and served as a vice president of the AMS for the term of February 2010 through January 2013.
In 2018 he was elected to be a member of the American Academy of Arts and Sciences.

References

External links

 

1946 births
Living people
Belgian emigrants to the United States
20th-century American mathematicians
21st-century American mathematicians
Topologists
Columbia College (New York) alumni
Princeton University alumni
Courant Institute of Mathematical Sciences faculty
Fellows of the American Mathematical Society
Institute for Advanced Study visiting scholars
Scientists from Brussels
Sloan Research Fellows